Scott Slimon (1915 – 1980) was a set decorator. He was nominated for an Academy Award in the category Best Art Direction for the film Suddenly, Last Summer.

Selected filmography
 Suddenly, Last Summer (1959)
 Bunny Lake Is Missing (1965)

References

External links

1915 births
1980 deaths
Film people from London
English set decorators